Praskolesy is a municipality and village in Beroun District in the Central Bohemian Region of the Czech Republic. It has about 900 inhabitants.

Transport
The municipality is located on a railway line leading from Prague to Plzeň. There is a train station which is served by regional trains.

Notable people
Josef Nešvera (1842–1914), composer
Alfred Seifert (1850–1901), Bohemian-German painter
Jiří Weil (1900–1959), writer and literary critic

References

External links

 

Villages in the Beroun District